A list of films produced by the Bollywood film industry based in Mumbai in 1948:

Highest-grossing films
The seven highest-grossing films at the Indian Box Office in 1948:

A-B

C-H

I-M

N-R

S-Z

References

External links
 Bollywood films of 1948 at the Internet Movie Database

1948
Bollywood
Films, Bollywood